The statue of Friedrich Wilhelm von Seydlitz is a bronze sculpture installed at Zietenplatz in Berlin, Germany.

References

Bronze sculptures in Germany
Statues in Berlin
Outdoor sculptures in Berlin
Sculptures of men in Germany
Statues in Germany
Buildings and structures in Mitte